Sergio Daniel Órteman Rodríguez (born 29 September 1978) is a Uruguayan football manager and former player who played as a midfielder. He is the current manager of Paraguayan club Resistencia.

Career
Born in Montevideo, Órteman began his career in Uruguayan club Central Español in 1997. In 2001, he was transferred to Olimpia of Paraguay. A year later, Órteman was part of the Olimpia team that won the 2002 Copa Libertadores (being selected as the most valuable player of the tournament) and the 2003 Recopa Sudamericana.
Reflecting on being selected as the most valuable player, Orteman said “I was just thinking of hugging my teammates and partying with them. Today I am still proud of my teammates for helping me achieve the individual prize.” 

He then moved to Independiente of Argentina in 2004, but had difficulties making the first team due to several injuries. For the 2005–06 season, Órteman went on loan to Mexican side Club Atlas. In July 2006, Órteman went back to Independiente. In 2007 Órteman joined Boca Juniors, and won the Copa Libertadores 2007 playing some minutes during the tournament. In the 2007–08 season, he played for Racing Santander, and has moved to Grêmio FBPA in July 2008.

On 17 February 2009, Órteman scored his only goal for Grêmio from Olimpico Monumental Stadium, before the goalkeeper Danrlei de Deus Hinterholz, who saved Brazil Pelotas from traditional Southern team where it is a city in Rio Grande do Sul State, with great care Roberson by Campeonato Gaúcho soccer.

On 21 August 2009, unhappy with his situation at Grêmio FBPA, he ended his contract with the club gaucho. Afterwards he moves to Uruguay to play for CA Peñarol.

On 28 May 2010, shortly after signing Sergio Blanco of Nacional Montevideo, the Mexican club Querétaro FC signed Órteman of Peñarol.

Honours

Club
Olimpia
 Copa Libertadores (1): 2002
 Recopa Sudamericana: 2003
Boca Juniors
 Copa Libertadores (1):2007
Peñarol
 Primera División: 2009–10

References

External links
 Argentine Primera statistics at Fútbol XXI  
 

1978 births
Living people
Footballers from Montevideo
Association football midfielders
Central Español players
Club Olimpia footballers
Club Atlético Independiente footballers
Atlas F.C. footballers
Boca Juniors footballers
Copa Libertadores-winning players
İstanbul Başakşehir F.K. players
Racing de Santander players
Grêmio Foot-Ball Porto Alegrense players
Peñarol players
Querétaro F.C. footballers
Club Guaraní players
Expatriate footballers in Brazil
Expatriate footballers in Turkey
Expatriate footballers in Argentina
Expatriate footballers in Mexico
Expatriate footballers in Paraguay
Argentine Primera División players
Uruguayan Primera División players
Süper Lig players
La Liga players
Liga MX players
Paraguayan Primera División players
Uruguayan expatriate footballers
Uruguayan expatriate sportspeople in Argentina
Uruguayan expatriate sportspeople in Mexico
Uruguayan expatriate sportspeople in Turkey
Uruguayan footballers
Uruguayan people of Spanish descent
Uruguayan people of German descent
Uruguayan football managers
Club Sol de América managers
Club Olimpia managers
Uruguayan expatriate football managers
12 de Octubre Football Club managers
Resistencia S.C. managers